Mervyn Roberts (23 November, 1906  12 July 1990), full name William Henry Mervyn Roberts, was a Welsh composer, best known for his piano music. Eiluned Davies regarded him as one of 'Y Pump Cymreig' (The Welsh Five) along with Denis ApIvor, Daniel Jones, Grace Williams and David Wynne, all born in the first two decades of the 20th Century.

Roberts was born and lived in Abergele, Denbighshire. He studied English and history at Trinity College, Cambridge from 1925 until 1928, and then at the Royal College of Music with R. O. Morris, Gordon Jacob and Arthur Alexander. He was most successful as a composer during the 1940s and 1950s, when a number of his works were published. He was an occasional teacher, a contributor to music journals and during the war worked in the Civil Service. In 1947 he married the pianist Eileen Easom. From 1963-67 he taught piano at Christ's Hospital, Horsham.

His music, chromatic but basically tonal, follows in the tradition of Arnold Bax and John Ireland. The piano works include the Variations on an Original Theme for two pianos (1932, revised 1942) and the Piano Sonata (1934, revised 1949), which won the Edwin Evans Prize in 1950 when first performed that year by Helen Perkin. It was the first Welsh piano sonata to be published (in 1951, by Novello). Other works for piano include the Sonatina (1948), Four Preludes (1949), Summer's Day and Wind of Autumn. He also wrote solo songs, part songs and chamber music.

References

External Links
 Performance of the Piano Sonata, by Steve Jones
 Summer's Day: Piano Music by Mervyn Roberts, performed by Christopher Williams. Tŷ Cerdd CD TCR032

1906 births
1990 deaths
People from Abergele
British classical pianists
Welsh composers
Alumni of Trinity College, Cambridge
Alumni of the Royal College of Music